Neoscaptia collateralis is a moth of the subfamily Arctiinae. It was described by George Hampson in 1900. It is found on New Guinea.

References

 

Moths described in 1900
Lithosiini